Gippsland Armed Forces Museum, is a military museum located at West Sale Airport, Victoria, Australia. It has over 1,500 items in its collection.

References

External links 
 Official homepage
 Facebook page

Military and war museums in Australia
Aerospace museums in Australia
Sale, Victoria